Machindragad Fort is a fort located  20 km from Karad. Though it is close to karad town it is in Wala taluka, Sangli district, of Maharashtra. The fort is situated on  a solitary round topped hill east of the base village.

History
This fort was built by Chhatrapati Shivaji Maharaj in 1676.Though it is called a fort there are no such fortification or bastions to be seen on the top of the hill except for few cannons and rock cut cisterns.The fort was garrisoned by the Pratinidhi till it was taken by Bapu Gokhale of Peshwas in1810. The fort was managed by Bapu Gokhale until it was surrendered to British Army headed by Colonel Hewiti without resistance.

How to reach
The nearest town is Karad which is 180 km from Pune. The base village of the fort is kille Machindragad which is 18 km from Karad. There are good hotels at Karad, now tea and snacks are also available in small hotels on the way. The trekking path starts from the hillock east of the base village.  The route is very safe and with well built steps which run zig-zag to reach the top. There are no trees on the trekking route. It takes about half an hour to reach the entrance gate of the fort. There is a temple of Machindranth on the fort. The night stay in the temple is possible.

Places to see
There is temple dedicated to saint Machindranath on the fort hill.Near the temple are few

See also 
 List of forts in Maharashtra
 List of forts in India
 Marathi People

References 

 
Buildings and structures of the Maratha Empire
Forts in Sangli district
16th-century forts in India
Former populated places in India